Thomas Ignatius Vanaskie (born November 11, 1953) is a former United States circuit judge of the United States Court of Appeals for the Third Circuit and former Judge of the United States District Court for the Middle District of Pennsylvania.

Early life and education, and professional career 

Born in Shamokin, Pennsylvania, Vanaskie received a Bachelor of Arts degree from Lycoming College in 1975 and earned a Juris Doctor from Dickinson School of Law in 1978. He was a law clerk for United States District Judge William Joseph Nealon Jr. on the United States District Court for the Middle District of Pennsylvania from 1978 to 1980. Vanaskie worked in private legal practice in Scranton, Pennsylvania, from 1980 to 1994.

District Court service 

On November 17, 1993, President Bill Clinton nominated Vanaskie to a seat on the United States District Court for the Middle District of Pennsylvania that was created by 104 Stat. 5089. Vanaskie was confirmed by the United States Senate on February 10, 1994, and received his commission on February 11, 1994. Vanaskie served as chief judge from 1999 to 2006. His service terminated on April 28, 2010, due to elevation to the Third Circuit.

Court of appeals service 

On August 6, 2009, President Barack Obama nominated Vanaskie to a seat on the United States Court of Appeals for the Third Circuit that was created when Judge Franklin Stuart Van Antwerpen assumed senior status in 2006. On November 5, 2009, Vanaskie's nomination was considered by the Senate Judiciary Committee. He was reported to the full Senate by the committee on December 3, 2009. Senate Majority Leader Harry Reid filed for cloture on Vanaskie's nomination on April 15, 2010. The Senate confirmed Vanaskie on April 21, 2010 by a 77–20 vote. He received his judicial commission on April 26, 2010. Vanaskie assumed senior status on November 30, 2018. He retired from active service on January 2, 2019.

References

External links 

1953 births
21st-century American judges
Dickinson School of Law alumni
Living people
Lycoming College alumni
Judges of the United States Court of Appeals for the Third Circuit
Judges of the United States District Court for the Middle District of Pennsylvania
People from Shamokin, Pennsylvania
United States court of appeals judges appointed by Barack Obama
United States district court judges appointed by Bill Clinton
20th-century American judges